When in Rome is a 1952 film directed by Clarence Brown and starring Van Johnson, Paul Douglas, and Joseph Calleia. The film was released by Metro-Goldwyn-Mayer, and was based on a story by Robert Buckner, Dorothy Kingsley, and Charles Schnee. The picture opens with the following text: ”1950 was a Holy Year. Three million pilgrims from every part of the world thronged to Rome, the Eternal City. Our story is about two men who journeyed to Rome that year. One was Father John X. Halligan, a young priest from Coletown, Pennsylvania, whose mission was a holy one. The other was Joe Brewster, late of Sing Sing, San Quentin, Joliet and Atlanta, whose mission was not so holy. If our story has a moral, it’s a simple one. God may move in mysterious ways, but He gets there just the same.”

Plot
Father John X. Halligan is a Catholic Priest visiting Rome for the 1950 Holy Year.  On the long voyage from New York City to Genoa, he makes friends with his cabin mate, Joe Brewster. Unknown to Halligan, Brewster is a career criminal wanted by American authorities; he faces a life sentence.

The ship docks in Genoa. When he sees police waiting, Brewster steals Halligan's clothing, cassock, hat and passport in order to evade arrest. Two priests appear to welcome  “Father Halligan”. When Halligan disembarks, wearing Brewster’s flamboyant clothes, he is arrested. The Genoa Commissario of Police believes his story when he chants a portion of the Mass.

Meanwhile, Brewster makes friends with an Irish priest and ends up staying with him in Rome, at the Monastery of the Three Saints. At a concert, he remembers his days as a choir boy.

Now dressed in borrowed clothes, Halligan reluctantly promises to aid the police. In Rome, he meets the cynical Commissario of Police. On the way to headquarters they stop for a procession. Halligan sees Brewster in it and says nothing. The Commissario tells Halligan that he will meet him the next morning at the Monastery of the Three Angels, where he is registered. Halligan, who actually has no place to stay, realizes that this must be Brewster and finds him there. Brewster asks for just one day. Halligan agrees—and prays for guidance. Once he is gone, Brewster follows suit.

The detective shadowing Halligan for his protection invites him home to supper, but they hear sirens. The Monastery of the Three Saints is on fire. Halligan runs back to rescue Brewster, who is fine. A beam falls, and he rescues Father Halligan. They clean up in the fountain of Trevi, then go to the deserted Coliseum, where Halligan asks why Brewster needs the whole day. Brewster wants to earn the total indulgence proclaimed by the Pope for the 1950 Holy Year. He starts by making his first confession in 20 years to Halligan. The two then make their way to the sites, with Halligan —and the audience—learning more and more about Brewster.

Halligan is still debating what to do when police see them. He helps Brewster evade arrest by ducking through an ancient door into a cloister where monks are working in the garden. In this order, the men remain enclosed for life and never talk to anyone except a superior. They are atoning for their own sins and the sins of the world. Brewster finds himself drawn to the place during his brief visit: “Where I was, you could feel the hate in the air, but here...“ As they leave, the abbot writes a note apologizing for everyone staring at them, but the iron latch that opened so easily for them has been corroded shut for 100 years.

Halligan and Brewster head to the train station while the streets fill with police. Once there, they become separated, and the Commissario finds Halligan. When he insists that Brewster is on a pilgrimage, the Commissario goes to the last stop, St. Peters, where they take him into custody and send him off in a van. Halligan, miserable at having inadvertently betrayed his friend, is convinced that the man is reformed: Then the news comes that Brewster has somehow escaped, which leaves Halligan unsure of himself and his judgement.

Retracing his steps, Halligan returns to the monastery. To his surprise, Brewster is there, wearing monk’s robes. He asks the abbot: Did Brewster tell him his whole story? Is he a worthy penitent? The abbot nods. Brewster writes to Halligan: prison was all past and no future, and this place is all future and no past. He asks when the next Holy Year will be. Halligan answers: in 25 years, and promises to visit then. A bell sounds, and they shake hands. Brewster steps back into the cloister and bolts the gate. Father Halligan strides down the hill to join the throngs walking toward the heart of the city.

Cast
 Van Johnson as Father John X. Halligan
 Paul Douglas as Joe Brewster
 Joseph Calleia as Aggiunto Bodulli, Commissario of Police in Rome
 Carlo Rizzo as Antonio Silesto
 Tudor Owen as Father McGinniss
 Dino Nardi as Commissario Genoa
 Aldo Silvaro as Cabby
 Mario Siletti as Luigi Lugucetti
 Emory Parnell as Ship's Captain

Reception
According to MGM records the film made $503,000 in the US and Canada and $180,000 elsewhere, resulting in a loss of $918,000.

References

External links
 
 

1952 films
1952 drama films
American black-and-white films
American drama films
Films about con artists
Films about Catholicism
Films directed by Clarence Brown
Films scored by Carmen Dragon
Films set in Italy
Films set in Rome
Metro-Goldwyn-Mayer films
1950s English-language films
1950s American films